Kristijan Fris (born 21 April 1984 in Senta, Serbia, Yugoslavia) is a Serbian sport wrestler.

He won a bronze medal at the 2007 World Wrestling Championships in Baku. He also won a bronze medal at the 2007 European Wrestling Championships. At the Mediterranean Games Kristijan won two gold medals.

Fris represented Serbia at the 2008 and 2016 Summer Olympics. He is an ethnic Hungarian.

In 2020, he won one of the bronze medals in the 60 kg event at the 2020 Individual Wrestling World Cup held in Belgrade, Serbia.

References

list of Kristijan's medals at SrbijaSport.com

External links 
 

1984 births
Living people
People from Senta
Serbian male sport wrestlers
Olympic wrestlers of Serbia
Wrestlers at the 2008 Summer Olympics
Wrestlers at the 2016 Summer Olympics
World Wrestling Championships medalists
European Games competitors for Serbia
Mediterranean Games gold medalists for Serbia
Mediterranean Games bronze medalists for Serbia
Competitors at the 2005 Mediterranean Games
Competitors at the 2009 Mediterranean Games
Competitors at the 2013 Mediterranean Games
Mediterranean Games medalists in wrestling
European champions for Serbia
European Wrestling Championships medalists
20th-century Serbian people
21st-century Serbian people